The Hibneryt is a Polish armored radar-directed self-propelled anti-aircraft gun system. A ZU-23-2 or ZUR-23-2S short-range air defense towed twin 23 mm autocannon fitted onto the Star 266's truck bed which has been modified and elevated to allow the AA gun to fire more freely. The wheels haven't been removed which allows the crew to remove the autocannon if need be which can be used as it originally was. The vehicle carries the ammo and equipment for the AA gun.
 Hibneryt-KG - Hibneryt armed with ZUR-23-2KG Jodek-G short-range air defense towed twin 23 mm autocannon. It has a storage space for the GROM missiles as well as engine-generator for the AA gun.
 Hibneryt-P - Custom variant made by soldiers from 3rd District Technological Workshops in Nowy Dwór Mazowiecki.

See also
Flakpanzer Gepard
Marksman
K30 Biho
Type 87
9K22 Tunguska

References

Armoured fighting vehicles of Poland
Anti-aircraft guns of Poland
Self-propelled anti-aircraft weapons
Science and technology in Poland
Armoured fighting vehicles of the post–Cold War period
23 mm artillery